The Mount Hyland Nature Reserve is a protected nature reserve that is located in the New England region of New South Wales, in eastern Australia.

The reserve is part of the New England Group of the UNESCO World Heritagelisted Gondwana Rainforests of Australia, inscribed in 1986 and added to the Australian National Heritage List in 2007.

Features
Mount Hyland is a triple peaked mountain, some  higher than the surrounding plain.

The temperate rainforest is of scientific interest, being a remnant of former Gondwana forests that once covered Australia. The rainforest lacks the Antarctic Beech and is dominated by Common Sassafras and other species.

This remote hotspot of biodiversity is home to many endangered animal species. Thus, in the early 1980s, the Hastings River mouse and rare pouched frog, which were believed to be extinct, were rediscovered.

Molluscs 
Indigenous molluscs at the reserve include the following species: Triboniophorus graeffei, Terrycarlessia turbinata, Protorugosa alpica, Austrorhytida harrietae, Parmavitrina planilabris, Mysticarion porrectus, Brazieresta larreyi, Thersites novaehollandiae and Austrochloritis sp.

See also

 Protected areas of New South Wales
 High Conservation Value Old Growth forest

References

External links

Nature reserves in New South Wales
Forests of New South Wales
Gondwana Rainforests of Australia
Protected areas established in 1984
1984 establishments in Australia
New England (New South Wales)